U55 or U-55 may refer to:
 U55 (Berlin U-Bahn)